North Chicago School District 187 is an Illinois school district headquartered in the Lake County city of North Chicago.

Schools
Green Bay Early Childhood Center (PreK)
Alexander (formerly North) (K-3)
Forrestal (K-3)
A.J. Katzenmeier (4-5)
Neal Math and Science Academy (6-8)
North Chicago Community High School (9-12)

District 187 previously governed ten schools: one early childhood center (Howard A. Yeager School), six elementary schools (A.J. Katzenmeier School, Forrestal Elementary School, Greenbay Elementary School, Marjorie P. Hart Elementary School, North Elementary School and South Elementary School), two middle/junior high schools (Novak 6th Grade Center and Neal Math and Science Academy) and one high school (North Chicago Community High School).

In 2013 the district closed two campuses, Greenbay and South. Additionally, in 2017 the district closed Yeager.

References

External links
District home page

North Chicago, Illinois
School districts in Lake County, Illinois